Otherwise may refer to:

 Otherwise (band), a rock band from Las Vegas, Nevada
 E's Otherwise, 2003 anime television series adaptation of E's

See also
 Difference (disambiguation)